Stojimir Dobrosavljević was a Serbian politician who collaborated with the Axis Powers in World War II. He served for less than two weeks as Minister of Social policy and People's Health for the Nedić regime in 1943, before the position was taken by Tanasije Dinić.

References

Serbian politicians
Serbian collaborators with Nazi Germany
Serbian people of World War II